The year 1980 was the 9th year after the independence of Bangladesh. It was also the fourth year of the Government of Ziaur Rahman.

Incumbents

 President: Ziaur Rahman
 Prime Minister: Shah Azizur Rahman
 Chief Justice: Kemaluddin Hossain

Demography

Climate

Economy

Note: For the year 1980 average official exchange rate for BDT was 15.45 per US$.

Events
 25 March – Bangladeshi armed forces allegedly attacked the village of Kawkhali and left about 300 dead.
 1 April - New regulation came into effect enabling the protection of foreign investments in Bangladesh from Government actions like nationalization and expropriation.
 May - The village level administrative bodies were formed for the first time under the title of "Swanirvar Gram Sarkar" (Self-sufficient village Government).
 May - President Rahman addressed letters to the Heads of Government of the countries of South Asia, presenting his vision for the future of the region and the compelling arguments for regional cooperation in the context of evolving international realities.
 17 June - Coup d'état attempt against President Rahman fails

Sports
 The Bangladesh Olympic Association was recognized by the International Olympic Committee on 1 January 1980.
 International football:
 Bangladesh participated in 1980 AFC Asian Cup, where they lost all 4 of their group matches and ended the tournament at the bottom of the points table.
 Domestic football:
 Mohammedan SC won Dhaka League title, while Team BJMC came out runners-up.
 Mohammedan SC & Brothers Union jointly won the first title of Bangladesh Federation Cup.
 Cricket:
 Pakistani cricket team visited Bangladesh but matches were abandoned due to unwarranted crowd interference during the first match.

Awards and recognitions

International Recognition
 Fazle Hasan Abed, the founder of BRAC, was awarded Ramon Magsaysay Award.

Independence Day Award

Ekushey Padak
 Abul Hussain (literature)
 Bedaruddin Ahmad (music)
 Mohammad Abdul Jabbar (music)
 Hamidur Rahman (art)
 Murtaja Baseer (art)
 Ronen Kushari (drama)
 Mujibur Rahman Khan (journalism)
 Mohammad Ferdous Khan (education)

Births
 Zunaid Ahmed Palak, politician
 Abdullah Al Rakib, chess grandmaster

Deaths
 20 April – Begum Badrunnessa Ahmed, social worker (b. 1903)
 30 June – Bhupati Bhushan Chowdhury, politician (b. 1930)

See also 
 1980s in Bangladesh
 List of Bangladeshi films of 1980
 Timeline of Bangladeshi history

References

 
Bangladesh
Bangladesh